Raorhynchus is a genus of worms belonging to the family Rhadinorhynchidae.

The species of this genus are found in almost all world oceans.

Species:

Raorhynchus cadenati 
Raorhynchus guptai 
Raorhynchus inexspectatus 
Raorhynchus megalaspisi 
Raorhynchus meyeri 
Raorhynchus polynemi 
Raorhynchus schmidti 
Raorhynchus terebra 
Raorhynchus thapari

References

Acanthocephalans